William Edward White (October 1860 – March 29, 1937) was a 19th-century American baseball player. He played as a substitute in one professional baseball game for the Providence Grays of the National League, on June 21, 1879.
Work by the Society for American Baseball Research (SABR) suggests that he may have been the first African-American to play major league baseball, predating the longer careers of Moses Fleetwood Walker and his brother Weldy Walker by five years, and Jackie Robinson by 68 years.

Very little is known about White, who replaced the regular first baseman, Joe Start, after the latter was injured. White was a student at Brown University and played for the college's team. He went 1-for-4 and scored a run as Providence won 5–3. It is unknown why White did not play for the Grays again. He was replaced in the next game by future Hall of Famer "Orator Jim" O'Rourke.

SABR's research indicates that the William Edward White who took the field that day was the son of a plantation owner from Milner, Georgia, Andrew Jackson White, and a black woman enslaved by White, Hannah. University records give Milner as the student's birthplace, and the only person of his name listed in the 1870 census was a nine-year-old mulatto boy who was one of three children living with his mother Hannah. All three of these children are named in A.J. White's 1877 will, which described them as the children of his servant Hannah White and stipulated that they be educated in the North. If the research by SABR is correct, then William White was not only the first black player in the major leagues, but may also have been the only former slave. Unlike the Walker brothers, White passed, and self-identified in multiple Census records, as white and did not face the virulent racism prevalent in the late 19th century.

According to 1900 and 1910 census records, White moved to Chicago and became a bookkeeper. He is listed there as having been born in Rhode Island and being white. The 1920 census, however, indicates that there was then a 60-year-old William E. White living in Chicago, whose parents were born in Georgia, and whose race was listed as "black". It is not certain that this is the same man.

References

External links

1860 births
1937 deaths
19th-century baseball players
African-American baseball players
Baseball players from Georgia (U.S. state)
Brown Bears baseball players
Major League Baseball first basemen
People from Lamar County, Georgia
Providence Grays players
Sportspeople from the Atlanta metropolitan area
Burials in Illinois